Tavakkoli Dede, also known as Tavakkoli-dede Sarayli (died 1625), was a Bosnian poet from Sarajevo. He wrote in Persian, although his works are no longer extant. It appears he got adept in Persian through his affliation with the Mevlevi Order.

References

1625 deaths
Date of birth unknown
17th-century Persian-language poets
Bosnian Muslims from the Ottoman Empire
17th-century poets from the Ottoman Empire
Male poets from the Ottoman Empire
Bosnia and Herzegovina poets
17th-century Bosnian people
People from Sarajevo
Mevlevi Order